The Boyne Obelisk, also known as King William's Obelisk, was an obelisk located in Oldbridge, near Drogheda, County Louth, Ireland.

History

The monument was erected in order to commemorate William of Orange's victory over King James II at the Battle of the Boyne in 1690, and was located near the spot where William's forces crossed the River Boyne to engage James' forces. The foundation stone was laid on 17 April 1736 by Lionel Sackville, Lord Lieutenant of Ireland.

Notably, King George IV visited the monument on 25 August 1821, as part of his visit to Ireland. A large crowd had gathered to see the king at the site, where he spent about 20 minutes. While there, the king received an audience with the Presbyterian Synod of Ulster.

In May 1894, two young men gathering watercresses from the river near the obelisk discovered an old sword under the mud in the water. The hilt was made of bone, the guard of ornamental silver gilt-work, and the blade was notched in several places and severely rusted. It was thought to have been used by a Williamite soldier in the Battle of the Boyne.

Around July 1895, the obelisk was struck by lightning and badly damaged. An appeal was made for donations to fund its restoration (amounting to £100), which was later completed.

During the Home Rule Crisis, members of the Ulster Flying Column and Dispatch Riding Corps travelled to Oldbridge on 28 July 1913, and planted a Union Jack and placard on the base of the Obelisk, which were later removed. The placard read: 

The obelisk stood until 31 May 1923, when it was destroyed shortly after the end of the Irish Civil War, purportedly by members of the National Army using three explosives or landmines removed from a nearby Irish Army camp. Only a small stump remains of the former monument.

Features

The Obelisk was made from granite and was built upon a large mound of rock (9 metres/30 ft high) located on the north bank of the River Boyne. At a height of 53 metres (174 ft), it was both the tallest man-made structure in Ireland and the tallest obelisk in Europe at the time of its construction. It initially stood adjacent to a wooden bridge spanning the river, which was later replaced by a lattice iron bridge (built by the Drogheda-based Thomas Grendon and Company) that was completed in 1869 and named the Obelisk Bridge, after the monument.

The square base of the Obelisk bore an inscription on each of its sides. The north side inscription read:

The south side inscription read: 

The east side inscription read:

The west side inscription read:

Gallery

References

External links

Aerial video of the Obelisk Bridge and the ruins of the Boyne Obelisk
Documentary by the Orange Order on the history of the Obelisk
The Boyne Foundation
Boyne Obelisk LOL 1690

Obelisks in the Republic of Ireland
Monumental columns in the Republic of Ireland
William III of England
Glorious Revolution
Orange Order
Demolished buildings and structures in the Republic of Ireland
Improvised explosive device bombings in the Republic of Ireland
Outdoor sculptures in Ireland
Buildings and structures completed in 1736
Irish Civil War
History of County Louth
Williamite War in Ireland
Buildings and structures demolished in 1923